Boardman is a city in Morrow County, Oregon, United States on the Columbia River and Interstate 84. As of the 2010 census the population was 3,220.  It is currently the largest town in Morrow County, Oregon.

History
Boardman was homesteaded in 1903 by Samuel H. Boardman,  the first superintendent of the Oregon State Parks System.  Boardman and his wife worked for 13 years to develop irrigation for their land; during those years his wife taught school, and Boardman at times worked on railroad construction projects. The Union Pacific Railroad passed through Boardman, where it had a station. The community was platted in 1916 at about the same time Samuel Boardman went to work for the Oregon State Highway Department and became involved in the development of roadside parks.

The Boardman post office opened in 1916. The city was incorporated in 1921. During construction of the John Day Dam on the Columbia River in the 1960s, the city had to be moved south, further from the water. Lake Umatilla, behind the dam, covered much of the original city.

South of Boardman, the U.S. Army Air Force established a training range in 1941. The Air Force transferred ownership of the range in 1960 to the U.S. Navy and it is now known as the Naval Weapons Systems Training Facility Boardman. The range is largely used by NAS Whidbey Island and the Oregon National Guard.

Geography
Boardman is in northeastern Oregon, along Interstate 84 south of the Columbia River.

Climate
Boardman has a steppe climate (Köppen BSk).

Demographics

Boardman is part of the Pendleton–Hermiston Micropolitan Statistical Area.

2010 census
As of the census of 2010, there were 3,220 people, 964 households, and 759 families residing in the city. The racial makeup of the city was 60.1% White, 0.7% African American, 0.9% Native American, 2.4% Asian, 0.3% Pacific Islander, 33.0% from other races, and 2.6% from two or more races. Hispanic or Latino of any race were 61.7% of the population.

There were 964 households, of which 53.2% had children under the age of 18 living with them, 54.9% were married couples living together, 14.7% had a female householder with no husband present, 9.1% had a male householder with no wife present, and 21.3% were non-families. 14.7% of all households were made up of individuals, and 3.9% had someone living alone who was 65 years of age or older. The average household size was 3.34, and the average family size was 3.70.

The median age in the city was 27.5 years. 35.1% of residents were under the age of 18; 11.4% were between the ages of 18 and 24; 28.9% were from 25 to 44; 18.8% were from 45 to 64; and 5.8% were 65 years of age or older. The gender makeup of the city was 53.3% male and 46.7% female.

2000 census
As of the census of 2000, there were 2,855 people, 853 households, and 686 families residing in the town. The population density was 798.2 people per square mile (307.9/km2). There were 947 housing units at an average density of 264.8 per square mile (102.1/km2). The racial makeup of the town was 55.24% White,1.93% Native American, 0.70% Asian,  0.39% African American, 0.11% Pacific Islander, 38.74% from other races, and 2.91% from two or more races. Hispanic or Latino of any race were 50.12% of the population.

There were 853 households, out of which 53.0% had children under the age of 18 living with them, 57.4% were married couples living together, 14.4% had a female householder with no husband present, and 19.5% were non-families. 14.7% of all households were made up of individuals, and 4.0% had someone living alone who was 65 years of age or older. The average household size was 3.33, and the average family size was 3.66.

 In the town the population was spread out, with 38.1% under the age of 18, 11.0% from 18 to 24, 30.5% from 25 to 44, 15.0% from 45 to 64, and 5.3% who were 65 years of age or older. The median age was 25 years. For every 100 females, there were 109.9 males. For every 100 females age 18 and over, there were 114.8 males.

The median household income was $32,105, and the median income for a family was $32,543. Males had a median income of $30,000 versus $21,765 for females. The per capita income for the town was $12,297. About 16.3% of families and 20.1% of the population were below the poverty line, including 26.2% of those under age 18 and 6.7% of those age 65 or over.

Economy

As of 2013, the six largest employers in Boardman are Lamb Weston (potato products) (370 employees); Oregon Potato Company (125); Portland General Electric (PGE) (113); the Morrow County School District (106), Boardman Foods, (100) and Amazon S3.

The Port of Morrow, Oregon's second-largest port, is adjacent to the city and located on the Columbia Riverfront. The port property also includes two (PGE) gas-fired power plants. PGE also has a coal-fired power plant in the Boardman area; opened in 1980, it had shut down in October, 2020 marking the closure of the last coal fired power plant in Oregon after 40 years of service. This 550MW power plant was the largest single point of emission of greenhouse gases in Oregon. Seven miles east of Boardman is the Irrigon Fish Hatchery. Threemile Canyon Farms is the largest farm located In Boardman.

According to a November 2008 article in The Oregonian, a "huge data center linked to Amazon.com [was] under construction" at the  Port of Morrow.  The data center was to have a dedicated 10-megawatt electrical substation. A website focused on data centers suggested the Boardman site was created in response to the rapid growth of Amazon Web Services; earlier in 2008, Amazon had announced that Amazon S3 was storing 29 billion objects (such as IMDb tables). The project made Boardman the second Oregon city along the Columbia River to host a power-hungry data center for web services: Google has a similar center in The Dalles. By 2012, Apple had announced plans for a server farm south of The Dalles in Prineville, where Facebook already had a similar farm. Rackspace was said to be considering  a data center at the Port of Morrow.  According to an August 2018 article in the East Oregonian, Amazon has two data centers in Boardman and one in Umatilla and is proposing to build four more data centers in the region. The three data centers in Boardman and Umatilla correspond to the three availability zones in AWS US-West-2 (Oregon) region.

The company hopes to build a much larger commercial refinery with a capacity of  annually. However, in April 2013, less than a month after start-up at the demonstration plant, ZeaChem halted production, citing funding problems. The company plans to resume production if financial backing can be found.

Coal export
Ambre Energy, a company based in Australia, has proposed using the Port of Morrow as a transfer point for shipping U.S. coal to Asia. It would ship the coal by train to Boardman, where it would be loaded on barges and hauled down the Columbia River to the Port of St. Helens. There it would be transferred to ocean-going ships headed for China, South Korea, Japan, and other Asian countries.

The Ambre plan has generated controversy among proponents touting economic benefits and opponents fearing environmental damage. After the public-comment period ends on August 12, 2013, the Oregon Department of Environmental Quality will decide whether to grant Ambre's request for permits to proceed. To export coal across Oregon in the way Ambre proposes, the company will also need approval from the Oregon Department of State Lands and the U.S. Army Corps of Engineers.

Transportation
It is a public airport used mainly for transient and local general aviation. Midcolumbia Bus Company are also in the Boardman area.

References

External links

 City of Boardman
 Entry for Boardman in the Oregon Blue Book
 

Cities in Oregon
Cities in Morrow County, Oregon
Oregon populated places on the Columbia River
Port cities in Oregon
Pendleton–Hermiston Micropolitan Statistical Area
Populated places established in 1927
1927 establishments in Oregon